Italian people may refer to:

 in terms of ethnicity: all ethnic Italians, in and outside of Italy
 in territorial terms: people of Italy, entire population of Italy, historical or modern
 in modern legal terms: all people who poses the citizenship of Italy

Other uses 
 Italian People's Party (1919), former political party in Italy 
 Italian People's Party (1994), former center-leftist political party in Italy
 Italian People's Party for Freedom, designation for Il Popolo della Libertà (party) in Italy
 Italian People's Bakery, in Trenton, New Jersey
 In the Name of the Italian People, an Italian film (1971)

See also 
 Italian (disambiguation)
 Italy (disambiguation)